Arthur's Club-Geneve 1995 was a 75-minute performance in Geneva by blues guitarist Mick Taylor, featuring Snowy White, recorded for a television special and a promotional album. It consists of a collections of blues classics, a Jimi Hendrix song and a Rolling Stones song with long jams.

Track listing
 "You Gotta Move" (Mississippi Fred McDowell) - 13:47
 "I Wonder Why" (Albert King) - 12:18
 "You Shook Me" (Willie Dixon, J. B. Lenoir) - 15:39
 "Judgment Day" (Snowy White) - 5:09
 "Little Wing" (Jimi Hendrix) - 6:54
 "Can't You Hear Me Knocking" (Mick Jagger, Keith Richards) - 22:40

Personnel
Mick Taylor - guitar, vocals
Snowy White - guitar, vocals
Kuma Harada - bass guitar
John "Rabbit" Bundrick - piano, organ, keyboards
Jeff Allen - drums, percussion

References

Snowy White albums
1995 live albums